Anne B. Newman M.D., M.P.H, (born 1955) is a scientist who researches Epidemiology and Gerontology. She received her Bachelor's, Master's and M.D. degrees from the University of Pittsburgh. Dr. Newman's primary focus of study is on atherosclerosis, longevity and what specific factors allow for people to thrive while aging.  She is well-versed in the subjects of cardiovascular disease, sarcopenia, and the body's physical and mental functions.  Born in Pennsylvania, the American research scientist focuses on Geriatrics, Gerontology and Epidemiology. She was the first scholar to be awarded the Katherine M. Detre Endowed Chair of Population Health Science at the University of Pittsburgh. She is widely published and has been listed on the annual ISI Web of Knowledge most highly cited scientists for 2015, as published by Thomson Reuters.  Newman is a member of the Delta Omega Honor Society in Public Health and the American Epidemiology Society. Dr. Newman's highest qualifications are in geriatric medicine and her certification is through the American Board of Internal Medicine. Newman lives in Point Breeze Pennsylvania with her husband, Frank Kirkwood. She is a mother of three to Dan, Joe, and Bridget.

Education
In 1978, Newman graduated from the University of Pittsburgh in 1978 with a bachelor's degree in biology. She earned her M.D. in 1982 from the University of Pittsburgh's School of Medicine. Newman completed her residency at Presbyterian University Hospital in Pittsburgh, Pennsylvania. She continued to serve at this same hospital for her fellowship in geriatrics. Upon completion of her fellowship in 1987, Newman also received her master's degree in public health from the University of Pittsburgh.

Research 
Dr. Newman began her research career with the National Heart, Lung, and Blood Institute's 19-year Cardiovascular Health Study in 1988, which evaluated men and women 65-years-old or more for the risk factors, consequences, and natural history of cardiovascular disease. She has also researched body mass and the effect of abdominal fat verses lower-body fat (fat deposits on the hips, thighs and buttocks), confirming that where the body stores fat impacts health. She has researched the impact of fitness on cognitive, muscle and physical function in aging and longevity. Newman has been involved in and served as the lead investigator for multiple long-term studies conducted with grants from the National Institute of Health and the CDC on aging. She is currently working as a Principal Investigator on clinical trials for the National Institute on Aging (NIA). Her current studies include Lifestyle and Independence for the Elderly (2009-2016),  ASPirin to Reduce Events in the Elderly (2009-2016), The Long Life Family Study (2004-2019), and the CHS All Stars Study (Exceptional Aging: 12 Year Trajectories to function (2004-2016).

Achievement 
In 2005, Newman joined the faculty at the University of Pittsburgh where she is both the chair of the department of epidemiology and director of the Center for Aging and Population Health. This center features a CDC Prevention Center which is acclaimed for its training of doctoral fellows in the Epidemiology of Aging, which was recognized with the NIA National Service Award.  Newman teaches four classes at the University of Pittsburgh: Advanced Epidemiology of Aging, Biology and Physiology of Aging, Writing in Epidemiology: Manuscripts and Grants, and Epidemiological Basis for Disease Control.  In 2014 she was honored as the first scholar to receive appointment as the Katherine M. Detre Endowed Chair of Population Health Science at the University of Pittsburgh. Newman has published more than 500 articles in scientific journals, is the Associate Editor of the Journal of Gerontology: Medical Science. She has been listed on the annual ISI Web of Knowledge most highly cited scientists for 2015, which was published by Thomson Reuters. She is the most cited author of a number of medical journals in his field: Journal of the American Geriatrics Society, Journals of Gerontology Series A-biological Sciences and Medical Sciences, Annals of Epidemiology, Archives of Internal Medicine.

Publications

References

External links 
 WorldCat Publications list

1955 births
Living people
University of Pittsburgh alumni
University of Pittsburgh faculty
American women physicians
20th-century women scientists
21st-century women scientists
American women academics
21st-century American women